Kámen may refer to:

Places in the Czech Republic
Kámen (Děčín District), a municipality and village in the Ústí nad Labem Region
Kámen (Havlíčkův Brod District), a municipality and village in the Vysočina Region
Kámen (Pelhřimov District), a municipality and village in the Vysočina Region
Kámen, a village and part of Kraslice in the Karlovy Vary Region
Kámen, a village and part of Křenice (Klatovy District) in the Plzeň Region
Bílý Kámen, a municipality and village in the Vysočina Region

Asteroids
70936 Kámen, an asteroid